Santo Severino Siorpaes (2 May 1832, Cortina d'Ampezzo – 12 December 1900) was an Italian mountaineer. His son, Giovanni Siorpaes, was also a mountaineer.

1832 births
1900 deaths
People from Cortina d'Ampezzo
Italian mountain climbers